Susana Solís Pérez is a Spanish politician who was elected as a Member of the European Parliament in 2019. She has since been serving on the Committee on Regional Development. In 2020, she also joined the Special Committee on Artificial Intelligence in a Digital Age.

In addition to her committee assignments, Pérez is a member of the European Parliament Intergroup on Artificial Intelligence and Digital, the European Internet Forum, the MEPs Against Cancer group, and the MEP Interest Group on Obesity & Health System Resilience.

References

1971 births
Living people
MEPs for Spain 2019–2024
21st-century women MEPs for Spain
Citizens (Spanish political party) MEPs